Angga Saputro (born 30 November 1993) is an Indonesian professional footballer who plays as a goalkeeper for Liga 1 club Borneo Samarinda. He is also a Second Sergeant in the Indonesian Army

Club career

Madura United
On 15 January 2017, Angga signed one-year contract with Liga 1 club Madura United. He made his professional debut in the Liga 1 on April 16, 2017.

TIRA-Persikabo
In 2018, Angga decided to return to Bogor and signed one-year contract with Liga 1 club TIRA-Persikabo. He made his professional debut in the Liga 1 on August 3, 2018.

Persebaya Surabaya
On 28 January 2020, Angga signed a one-year contract with Persebaya Surabaya on a free transfer. This season was suspended on 27 March 2020 due to the COVID-19 pandemic. The season was abandoned and was declared void on 20 January 2021.

Borneo
He was signed for Borneo to play in Liga 1 in the 2021 season. Angga made his debut on 4 September 2021 in a match against Persebaya Surabaya.

Honours

Club
Persebaya Surabaya
 East Java Governor Cup: 2020

References

External links
 
 Angga Saputro at Liga Indonesia

1993 births
Indonesian footballers
Association football goalkeepers
Liga 1 (Indonesia) players
Living people
Persikabo 1973 players
Madura United F.C. players
Persebaya Surabaya players
Borneo F.C. players
People from Sidoarjo Regency
Sportspeople from East Java